Oldham County is a county located in the U.S. state of Texas. As of the 2020 census, its population was 1,758. Its county seat is Vega. The county was created in 1876 and organized in 1881. Oldham County is included in the Amarillo, TX Metropolitan Statistical Area.

History 
Oldham County was formed in 1876 and organized in 1881, and named for Williamson Simpson Oldham, Sr., a Texas pioneer and Confederate Senator. At the time of its organization, about half of the county was a part of the XIT Ranch.  The county seat was originally at the town of  Tascosa, Texas, which in the 1880s was one of the largest towns in the Panhandle. As the railroads came through the county, however, they bypassed Tascosa; several new towns and farms sprang up along the rail lines, and by 1915 Tascosa had a courthouse and almost no residents; the county seat was moved to Vega that year. Oldham County is primarily ranch and farm land, with many thousands of acres planted in wheat, the major crop. The county also has some petroleum production and large wind farms.

Geography
A southern strip of the county, including the county seat Vega, is located on top of the Llano Estacado (Staked Plains). The next approximately 12 miles slope down to the Canadian River. The former county seat of Tascosa is located at a crossing of the Canadian River north of Vega. The terrain then slopes up from the Canadian River, passing the county line at approximately 6 miles and reaching the top of the High Plains a further four miles north.

Border dispute with New Mexico
For years there has been a simmering dispute over a strip of land running north and south, including an abandoned part of Glenrio at the west end of Oldham County, as to which state it is lawfully a part of. The border between the two states was originally defined as the 103rd meridian, but the 1859 survey that was supposed to mark that boundary mistakenly set the border between 2.29 and 3.77 miles too far west of that line, making the current towns of Farwell, Texline and the east part of Glenrio appear to be within the State of Texas.  New Mexico's short border with Oklahoma, in contrast, was surveyed on the correct meridian.  New Mexico's draft constitution in 1910 stated that the border is on the 103rd meridian as intended.  The disputed strip, hundreds of miles long, includes parts of valuable oilfields of the Permian Basin.  A bill was passed in the New Mexico Senate to fund and file a lawsuit in the U.S. Supreme Court to recover the strip from Texas, but the bill did not become law.

The question was once settled in favor of Texas by the intervention of President William Howard Taft at the request of Senator John Villiers Farwell, whose three-million-acre XIT Ranch would have been diminished by New Mexico's claim. With Taft's support, on February 16, 1911, the Joint Resolution of Congress on admitting New Mexico as a state declared that any provision of New Mexico's constitution that "...in any way tends to annul or change the boundary lines between the State of Texas and Territory of New Mexico shall be of no force and effect."  

Today, land in the strip is included in Texas land surveys, and the land and towns (the east part of Glenrio in Deaf Smith and Oldham Counties) for all purposes are taxed and governed by the State of Texas.

Major highways
  Interstate 40
   Business Loop Interstate 40 / U.S. Highway 66
  U.S. Highway 385
  State Highway 214

Adjacent counties
 Hartley County (north)
 Moore County (northeast)
 Potter County (east)
 Deaf Smith County (south)
 Quay County, New Mexico (west/Mountain Time Zone)
 Randall County (southeast)

Demographics

Note: the US Census treats Hispanic/Latino as an ethnic category. This table excludes Latinos from the racial categories and assigns them to a separate category. Hispanics/Latinos can be of any race.

As of the census of 2000, there were 2,185 people, 735 households, and 565 families residing in the county.  The population density was 2 people per square mile (1/km2).  There were 815 housing units at an average density of 0 per square mile (0/km2).  The racial makeup of the county was 90.66% White, 1.88% Black or African American, 1.28% Native American, 0.37% Asian, 4.62% from other races, and 1.19% from two or more races.  11.03% of the population were Hispanic or Latino of any race. In terms of ancestry, 25.2% were of German, 14.1% were of Irish, 10.4% were of English, 4,7% were of American, 3,3% were of French, 2,9% were of Dutch.

There were 735 households, out of which 35.10% had children under the age of 18 living with them, 66.70% were married couples living together, 8.80% had a female householder with no husband present, and 23.00% were non-families. 21.00% of all households were made up of individuals, and 10.10% had someone living alone who was 65 years of age or older.  The average household size was 2.61 and the average family size was 3.02.

In the county, the population was spread out, with 35.00% under the age of 18, 7.20% from 18 to 24, 23.30% from 25 to 44, 23.20% from 45 to 64, and 11.30% who were 65 years of age or older.  The median age was 33 years. For every 100 females there were 108.10 males.  For every 100 females age 18 and over, there were 90.60 males.

The median income for a household in the county was $33,713, and the median income for a family was $39,091. Males had a median income of $26,845 versus $20,185 for females. The per capita income for the county was $14,806.  About 10.50% of families and 19.80% of the population were below the poverty line, including 20.00% of those under age 18 and 7.90% of those age 65 or over.

Communities

Cities
 Adrian
 Vega (county seat)

Census-designated place
 Boys Ranch

Unincorporated community
 Wildorado

Ghost towns
 Boise
 Landergin
 Tascosa

Education
School districts:
 Adrian Independent School District
 Boys Ranch Independent School District
 Channing Independent School District
 Vega Independent School District
 Wildorado Independent School District

All of the county is in the service area of Amarillo College.

Gallery

Politics
In presidential elections, Oldham County is solidly Republican.

See also

 List of museums in the Texas Panhandle
 National Register of Historic Places listings in Oldham County, Texas
 Recorded Texas Historic Landmarks in Oldham County

References

External links

 Oldham County government's website
 Oldham County in Handbook of Texas Online at the University of Texas
 Oldham County Profile from the Texas Association of Counties

 
1881 establishments in Texas
Populated places established in 1881
Texas Panhandle